Ramiro Lopez may refer to:

 Ramiro Lopez, artist; see Intec Digital
 Ramiro López (born 1984), Argentine footballer for Arsenal de Sarandí